Acacia pubifolia  is a species of wattle native to northern New South Wales.

References

pubifolia
Flora of New South Wales